The Muslim Jewish Conference (MJC) is an annual inter-cultural, inter-religious conference based in Vienna. MJC is a dialogue and leadership project that targets future leaders from sectors of economics, academics and politics in the start of their careers.

The first annual Muslim Jewish Conference has taken place from the 1st until the 6th of August 2010 at the University of Vienna.

60 Jewish and Muslim students from all over the world with a common goal of establishing peaceful relations between both religions participated. The conference consists of discussion committees, guest speakers, open dialogue panels and social events.

The second annual Muslim Jewish Conference took place from 3 July until the 8 July 2011 in Kyiv, Ukraine.

Thematic Committees 

The 2010 conference was split into three thematic committees: 
Islamophobia and Anti-semitism
Education
The role of Media

Additionally, a group was introduced by the conference; the Muslim Jewish Connection. This organization founded by a Rabbi David Goldberg in 2008 focuses on education for youth and adults in the Middle East. The MJCii led groups in workshops in Education during the seminar.

Organising Committee 

There are currently 15 Students working together on this project, bringing valuable experience and diplomatic skills to the team as well as expertise in cross cultural dialogue. Coming from eight different countries Austria, Pakistan, Lebanon, Saudi Arabia, Switzerland, Libya, Turkey, Israel and the United States of America, the core team is already well trained in interfaith communication.

The Organisation Committee:

 Ilja Sichrovsky - Secretary General
 Ayse Cindilkaya - Vice Secretary General
 Andi Gergely - Head of Logistics
 Valerie Prassl – Head of Public Relations
 Arthur Resetschnig – Organization & Fundraising
 Anna Magnand – Head of Support Department
 Fatima Hasanain – Head of Committees and Content
 Asad Farooq – Head of Chairs
 Gulraiz Khan – Chair
 Dagmar Kusa – Chair
 Varghese Chakkummootil – Chair
 Yvonne Feiger – Chair
 Maryam Mohiuddin Ahmed - Chair
 Jane Braden-Golay - Chair
 Mustafa Jalil Qureshi - Chair
 Mounir Dadi - Chair
 Lisa Joskowicz – Advisor of Chairs
 Bacem Al-Jaziri - International Advisor Europe
 Ben Rosen - International Advisor North America
 Abdul Kareem Niazi - International Advisor Middle East
 Jacqueline Nowikovsky - International Advisor Eastern Europe
 Moussa Jamil - International Advisor Europe and Middle East
 Magdalena Kloss - International Advisor United Nations
 Rida Al Masri - International Advisor Middle East

Endorsements 

The Muslim Jewish Conference is officially endorsed by the United Nations' Alliance of Civilizations (UNAOC), the Austrian Ministry of Foreign Affairs and the University of Vienna. The project is partly financed by the Karl Kahane Foundation as well as by private donors.

Patronage & Honorary Committee 2010 

The first 'Muslim Jewish Conference' found itself under the official patronage of the President of Austria, Dr. Heinz Fischer

The 2010 members of the Honorary Committee:
 Patricia Kahane, President of the 'Karl Kahane Foundation'.
 Rabbi Marc Schneier, Chairman of the World Jewish Congress American Section, Founder and President of The Foundation for Ethnic Understanding (FFEU).
 Dr Michael Häupl, Mayor of Vienna
 Dr Alois Mock former Vice-Chancellor and Foreign Minister of Austria, former President of the International Democratic Union (IDU), founder of the Central European Initiative (CEI).
 Dipl Ing Dr Franz Fischler, former Commissioner of the European Union (1995–2004) and former Federal Minister for Agriculture and Forestry in Austria, Expert on international food crises and development and Advocate of the UN Millennium Development Goals.
 Ibrahim Issa, Co-Director of Hope Flowers School, which is unique in the Palestinian territories in that it has a remarkable educational philosophy. It has a special curriculum dedicated to peace, democracy, human rights, conflict-resolution and understanding as well as general topics such as women’s rights, democracy, health and other community concerns.
 Dr Zeynep Taluy-Grossruck, former Director of UNIDO (United Nations Industrial Development Organization), Private Sector Development Branch
 Rafi Elul, Advisor to the President of Israel for social and welfare matters, former Consultant to the Prime Minister of Israel in social and welfare matters, former member of the Israeli Parliament for eight years, formerly one of the youngest mayors in Israeli history at age 24.
 Prof Eveline Goodman-Thau, first orthodox female Rabbi and Founder of the ‘Hermann Cohen Academy’ in Buchen (Odenwald); as its Director she organizes conferences and learner's seminaries, especially for Jewish women.
 Abbas Khider, award winning Iraqi-German writer (a.o. honorary certificate Iraqi-International Cultic Studies Association (I.C.S.A.)).
 André Heller, Austrian Actor, Singer and Author.
 Mag Dr Jameleddine Ben Abdeljelil, Department of Near Eastern Studies - University of Vienna.
 Susanne Scholl, Austrian journalist and writer, former Head of the ORF-Bureau in Moscow.
 Josef Hader, Austrian Comedian and Actor.

Guest Speakers 2010 

Grand-Rabbi Marc Raphaël Guedj is the President of the Geneva-based interreligious Foundation 'Racines Et Sources' (roots and well-springs), which brings Rabbis and Imams together to work for peace. He is the former Chief Rabbi of Geneva’s traditional Jewish congregation. Rabbi Guedj is a member of the Editorial Committee of the World Congress of Imams and Rabbis for Peace at UNESCO.

Dr Faouzi Skali is an anthropologist and ethnologist; professor at the Ecole Normale Supérieure in Fes, Morocco, and author of many publications including "La Voie Soufi" (The Soufi Path) and "Traces de Lumiere" (Traces of Light). He is also the Initiator of the Mediterranean Institute for Dialogue Project and Director of the Fes Festival of World Sacred Music. Dr. Skali has coordinated a colloquium to follow the festival called Giving Soul to Globalization, a meeting place for humanitarians and international leaders in the business world to work together to develop more space for spirituality in the working world. He was recognized in 2001 by the UN, among seven world personalities, having contributed to the Dialogue of Civilisations.

Walter Ruby has served as Muslim Jewish Relations Officer for The Foundation for Ethnic Understanding (FFEU) since March 2008. A strong proponent of Muslim-Jewish communication, reconciliation and cooperation, he organized the FFEU-sponsored Weekend of Twinningsm of Mosques and Synagogues Around the World in November 2008 and 2009. (115 mosques and 115 synagogues in North America and Europe took part in the Weekend of Twinnings in 2009 and more are expected to take part in 2010). A reporter before joining FFEU, Ruby served as the New York and United Nations correspondent for the Jerusalem Post and Moscow correspondent for the Jerusalem Post and The Forward. During the 1990s Ruby was a co-founder of Encounter, a pioneering Internet community composed of Palestinians, Jews, Israelis, Arabs and others, focused on fostering dialogue and joint projects.

References

External links 
 
 United Nations Alliance of Civilisations (UNAOC)
 Austrian Ministry of Foreign Affairs
 The Karl Kahane Foundation

Islam and Judaism